Dimitrios Papadimoulis (born 21 March 1955) is a Greek politician and Member of the European Parliament (MEP) as a member of the European United Left-Nordic Green Left.

On 18.1.2022, he was re-elected as vice-president of the European Parliament for the fourth consecutive time, with the support of a broad cross-party majority and with a 74.77% share of the vote, garnering 492 positive votes out of a total of 658 valid ballots. Since 2014 he is the only Greek and the only representative from the GUE-NGL political group at the Presidium of the European Parliament.

According to the VoteWatch.EU, he is the most influential Greek MEP in the European Parliament.

In 2020, he was included at the Top 10 most influential MEPs in the European Parliament (9th place) in a list of 100 MEPs from the 705 EP and 27 Member States. The SYRIZA MEP was first in his political group (European United Left / Nordic Green Left) but also first among Greek MEPs.

Born in 1955 in Athens. Graduated with distinction from Varvakeio Junior High School of Athens and studied with scholarship at the School of Civil Engineering of NTUA (National Technical University of Athens). He has worked as an engineer and business executive (1980-2004). Since the age of 18 and his student days, he participates actively and joins the left movement, where he remains since then.

 Member of the Presidium of the Central Committee of National Student Union of Greece (1976-1979), of the leadership of the Communist youth organization "Rigas Feraios" and later at the leadership of the "Greek Communist Party of the Interior" (Eurocommunist) and political party of E.AR ("Greek Left").
 Member of the Joint Committee who prepared the common Report between E.AR and the Communist Party of Greece (1988), which led to the formation of the Coalition of the Left. - - Member of the elected leading bodies of the Coalition of the Left - since its formation as a single party (1992)- and later SYRIZA.
 He was elected to the European Parliament (2004-2009) and the Greek Parliament (2009-2014).
 Member of the Parliamentary Assembly of the Council of Europe (2009-2014) and Vice President of the Group of the Unified European Left (UEL).
 He was re-elected as MEP in the 2014 European elections. At the suggestion of Alexis Tsipras, he was unanimously elected head of the SYRIZA delegation at the European Parliament. 
 In July 2014, he was elected vice-president of the European Parliament with a percentage of positive votes 42.1%. He was re-elected Vice President in January 2017 with a new percentage of positive votes measuring 73.5%.

•	In the Parliamentary Evaluation Report on the term 2014–2019, published by "Vote Watch Europe", Dimitris Papadimoulis was evaluated as the Greek MEP with the greatest influence on the European Institutions. 
In an earlier report by VoteWatch.EU, he was also one of the three most active MEPs in the entire European Parliament, for the period 2004–2009.

 2019 - now 
Member of European Parliament. Elected first, with the highest number of votes among the SYRIZA-Progressive Alliance MEPs (272.835 votes). Head of the SYRIZA delegation at the EP. 
 Vice President of the European Parliament with a percentage of 60.5%.

He is a full member of the Committee on Economic and Monetary Affairs (ECON) and the Committee on Budgets (BUDG) and a substitute member of the Committee on Regional Development (REGI).

Early life
Papadimoulis studied engineering at the National Technical University of Athens.

Career
Papadimoulis was an MEP from 2004 to 2009.

From 2009 to 2014 he was a member of the Greek parliament.

Since 2014, he has again been an MEP.

Since 1 July 2014, he has been one of the simultaneous 14 as Vice President of the European Parliament.

Vice-President of the European Parliament
Head of the SYRIZA delegation
Member of the European Parliament's "Progressive Caucus" steering committee

From 2014 he is the only Greek and the only representative from the GUE-NGL political group at the Presidium of the European Parliament. 
According to the VoteWatch.EU, he is the most influential Greek MEP in the European Parliament.

Born in 1955 in Athens. Graduated with distinction from Varvakeio Junior High School of Athens and studied with scholarship at the School of Civil Engineering of NTUA (National Technical University of Athens). 
He has worked as an engineer and business executive for 25 years (1980-2004). 
He is married to Nadia Soubasaki and they have two children.

•	His first term in the European Parliament was in 2004–2009, and shortly afterwards he was elected in the Greek Parliament in 2009 and 2012 (2009-2014).

•	Ηe was re-elected as an MEP in the 2014 European elections. 
At the suggestion of Alexis Tsipras, he was unanimously elected head of the SYRIZA delegation at the European Parliament. 
In July 2014, he was elected vice-president of the European Parliament with a percentage of 42.1%. 
He was re-elected Vice President in January 2017 with a percentage of 73.5%.

•	In May 2019, he was elected first, with the highest number of votes from the SYRIZA-Progressive Alliance MEPs and took over as head of the SYRIZA delegation at the European Parliament. 
In July 2019 he was re-elected Vice President of the European Parliament with a percentage of 60.5%.

He is a regular member of the Committee on Economic and Monetary Affairs (ECON) and a substitute member of the Committee on Regional Development (REGI).

See also

 List of members of the European Parliament for Greece, 2009–14
 Political groups of the European Parliament

References

Further reading

External links
 
 
Personal website (GR and EN)  www.papadimoulis.gr

1955 births
Living people
Syriza MEPs
Coalition of Left, of Movements and Ecology politicians
Coalition of Left, of Movements and Ecology MEPs
MEPs for Greece 2004–2009
Greek MPs 2009–2012
Greek MPs 2012 (May)
Greek MPs 2012–2014
MEPs for Greece 2014–2019
MEPs for Greece 2019–2024
Politicians from Athens